This is a list of compositions by Robert Schumann for piano solo. For his other compositions, see List of compositions by Robert Schumann.

Pieces

References
Sources

 
Piano compositions by German composers
Piano compositions in the Romantic era
Lists of piano compositions by composer
Lists of compositions by composer